Jean-François Champagne (Semur-en-Auxois, 1 July 1751 - Paris, 14 September 1813, was a French scholar.

In a unique way, he spent most of his life within the walls of the same academic institution, "Lycée Louis-le-Grand" in the heart of Paris, as pupil when a teenager, then as simple teacher, and grew to be its first Head Teacher, while in parallel that establishment evolved from a medley of various private and mostly religious educational foundations under the reigns of Louis XV and Louis XVI into the prototype model of highest level colleges in the French educational system, that emerged in the turmoil of the Revolution years from the educational dreams of the new ruling middle class and took its fundamental properties in the early  Empire days ("Lycée").

Most of all, through the difficult revolutionary years and multiple throes, hazards and harassments  during the French Revolution, he contrived in keeping open the Lycée Louis-le-Grand throughout the period, a unique case for institutions of that type.

Also notable for some academic work as Hellenist, acknowledged translator of ancient Greek writings, and distinguished as member of the Académie des inscriptions et belles-lettres, he was closely linked to a transient personality of the Revolution years, Pierre Henri Hélène Marie Lebrun-Tondu, as of his real name TONDU, also known as LEBRUN or TONDU-LEBRUN, who grew to be Minister of Foreign Affairs for one year (August 1792-June 1793) and ultimately fell a victim to the Terror period instated by Robespierre and his friends.

Biography

Youth and training for educational career
Born in 1751 in the small city of Semur-en-Auxois in Burgundy, he got there his early terms of education, certainly with some brilliancy, as he was selected by local powers-that-be to pursue them from his very early teens on at "Louis-le-Grand", already then a  famous educational compound in the center of Paris that was at that time, under the reigns of Louis XV and Louis XVI, organized as a medley of various private and mostly religious educational foundations, where pupils where funded by powers-that-be of high noble rank or of religious standing (such as abbeys or bishops), for example the "collège Dainville" (also designated sometimes as the "collège d'Inville"), that was patronized by the Chapter of the Cathedral of Noyon (61 Oise, France).

The "collège Louis-le-Grand" happened in the three decades preceding the French Revolution to be the mold of education of will-be prime players in that world-changing period: universally-known Maximilien Robespierre and Camille Desmoulins, but also Pierre Henri Hélène Marie Lebrun-Tondu (later known as Minister of Foreign Affairs of the First French Republic, from August 1792 till June 1793, under the name of LEBRUN or of   LEBRUN-TONDU), all born, like Jean-François Champagne, in the 1750s and early 1760s decade, underwent there most of their education, but as well many promising students with high hopes and perspectives in the sciences, who for example later on joined the Observatoire de Paris, that entertained several research departments of various types (including Mathematics), under the lead of the successive Cassinis, for the which careers "Louis-le-Grand" was a kind of antechamber.
 
Beneficiary of a scholarship grant from his home town, he stays at Louis-le-Grand as a pupil from 1767 till 1778, then follows up as  a  simple teacher, then Head teacher for the 6th grade class and probably in succession higher grades. He takes up a statute as religious (« Louis–le-Grand » is then under the supervision of the Company of Jesus), and becomes a deacon, a « natural » path for those that considered teaching careers in those days (Lebrun-Tondu, three years younger than Champagne, followed pretty much the same path until his mid twenties; they were closely linked as events will spectacularly put in light in 1794).

All those steps prepared what should have been a regular, stolid and uneventful educational career. However the great tide of the French Revolution was to change that, as for many others. Around mid 1791, collateral effects of the French Revolution then in full gear-up up bearing on the religious communities that steer the college bring about Jean-François Champagne’s  nomination as Head of the College; he will in fact steer it in a uniquely successful way throughout the ensuing 20 years.

Steering "Louis-le-Grand" through the Revolution years

He has been a teacher about ten years when the Revolution comes out (1789) ; in the ensuing two years, senior colleagues, most of whom with a religious grade of some sort, resign and quit their position. Not him; he steadfastly remains and thus becomes Head Teacher on May 3, 1791.

A circumstantial Head Teacher, he reveals himself a providential guide for the « Lycée Louis-Le-Grand » through  the French Revolution turmoil, body-and-soul  devoted to his institution and charge

Keeping a firm hand on what remains of the initial College, he will steer it through 
the turmoil and extraordinary changes and hazards of that extraordinary period.

First of all, playing on all his links with the new and rapidly changing powers (he becomes an active member of the Comité révolutionnaire, section Panthéon-Français), he contrives to remain constantly confirmed in his role as Head of the institution, while it undergoes an incredible succession of names and organizational changes : “Collège Égalité” (1793), “Institut des Boursiers Égalité” (1796), “Prytanée Français (1798),  “Collège de Paris” (1800), “Lycée de Paris” (1803) and finally  “Lycée Impérial” (1804).

Times are really tough; the originally privately funded institution is deprived of all its properties and own sources of revenues, no allocation is attributed it for quite some time, and he must resort to all sorts of ways, means and expedients to even barely feed his pupils. The site is requisitioned at several occasions and for diverse purposes, even serving as a jail for part of its premises in 1793; notwithstanding all hazards and all enmities and attempts at appropriation, Jean-François Champagne succeeds in keeping the school open for a remainder of students (the older ones have been sent to join the Revolutionary Army on a variety of locations from 1792 on even as late as 1796!) throughout the times, a unique “tour de force” without any equivalent from any institution of that type during that period in France.

Mostly on his sole energy, dedication, unwavering will and purpose, he contrives in keeping Louis-le-Grand open throughout those troubled times.

In January 1794, he definitely abandons his cleric status to marry the widow of his co-disciple and friend Pierre Hélène Tondu, executed in late December 1793 under orders of Robespierre, this latter himself onetime pupil at Louis-le-Grand like Tondu and Champagne, and who execrated Tondu. Together with the widow, he takes on the charge of the six children of Tondu, who had entrusted them unto his care in a letter written a few hours before being sent to the guillotine, all boys of whom will be educated in that same Louis-le-Grand where they have then taken their abode with their father-in-law.

Head Teacher of the prototype best-in-class "Lycée Impérial" 

The advent of the Napoleon years brings a total reversal to these hardships. Tuition and education become again a priority of the State; Louis-le-Grand becomes the model of all high school levels institutions according to the new concepts introduced under the  Consulate and Empire early years, and becomes  designated as “le Prytanée Français”; former pupils are become themselves teachers and Heads of like establishments that sprout out in all large cities, the “lycées impériaux”.

For 15 years, Jean-François Champagne will serve as the exemplary Head Teacher of Louis-le-Grand. 
Widely recognized, Jean-François Champagne moves from survival mode to model firmness, order and method, and lords undisputed for an additional 10 years over the revamped Louis-le-Grand, where discipline and application to work are become master words. And in practice as in words! From 1801 on, the private confinement “cells” of the school, where rebellious or insufficiently motivated pupils were detained on bread and water only, were booked 100% on a permanent basis, to the point that in 1803, Champagne requested an extension of their numbers to meet a 1% ratio of the pupils’ population!

In parallel, Jean-François Champagne at last has some enough spare time and energy to pursue some personal accomplishments, especially in ancient Greece literature and academics, he enters the  “Institut de France, classe des Sciences morales et politiques”, in 1795, and even dabbles with politics, getting elected to the  Conseil des Cinq-Cents, although it seems he never actually sat.

By 1810, ailing health leads to his more or less voluntary retirement from the position and premises that had been his scope for 50 years, he dies three years later on September 14, 1813.

Distinctions 
 Member of Académie des inscriptions et belles-lettres (1797)
 Member of Légion d'honneur

Main published works 
La Politique d'Aristote, ou la science des gouvernements : ouvrage traduit du grec, avec des notes historiques et critiques, par le citoyen Champagne, 2 volumes, 1797
Vues sur l'organisation de l'instruction publique dans les écoles destinées à l'enseignement de la jeunesse, par le citoyen Champagne, 1799–1800
Sur l'Éducation. Notions générales qui peuvent et doivent être adaptées à tous les degrés d'instruction, 1802
La Mer libre, la Mer fermée, ou Exposition et analyse du traité de Grotius intitulé la Mer libre et de la réplique de Selden intitulée la Mer fermée, 1803

Notes and references 

 Pierre Henri Hélène Marie Lebrun-Tondu
 Robespierre
 Camille Desmoulins

Sources 
 Louis Gabriel Michaud, Biographie universelle, ancienne et moderne, p. 392-395
 Web Site of "Lycée Louis-le-Grand"

1751 births
1813 deaths
Hellenists
Educators from Paris
Members of the Académie des Inscriptions et Belles-Lettres
Burials at Père Lachaise Cemetery